Ružinov is a borough of Bratislava, the capital of Slovakia, located in the Bratislava II district. It is the city's second most populated borough, housing over 80,000 inhabitants and its Nivy neighbourhood is the place of the emerging new city center of Bratislava. Ružinov features extensive residential areas, as well as major industrial facilities and transport infrastructure including the Milan Rastislav Štefánik international airport and the D1 motorway.

The borough features the Slovnaft refinery, Avion Shopping Park mall, Ružinov hospital, Štrkovec lake, Zlaté Piesky recreational area and numerous schools and churches.

Location 
Ružinov is bordered by the borough of Old Town to the north-west, Nové Mesto to the north, Rača and Vajnory to the north-east, Podunajské Biskupice to the south and Petržalka to the west across the river Danube connected by the Prístavný most.

Division 

Ružinov is divided into the following neighborhoods:
 Vlčie hrdlo
 Nivy
 Prievoz
 Trávniky
 Štrkovec
 Pošeň
 Ostredky
 Trnávka

Ružinov is cadastrially divided into three parts: Ružinov, Nivy and Trnávka.

History
In place of today's Ružinov there were originally meadows, pastures, grasslands and woodland, interspersed with islands and channels of the Danube. The people living here worked in agriculture, ranching and logging. In the 19th century, the agricultural character of the area was slowly disappearing, as many new factories were built in the area. The current name was only coined in the 20th century, and is based on the term Ružový ostrov, which translates as the Rose Island.

Characteristics

Today, Ružinov is a location for many industrial businesses, shopping centres, financial businesses and banks. Industrial plants such as Slovnaft and Gumon, and the cargo Port of Bratislava, are located here. Apart from the chemical industry it is home to food and construction industries. The Miletičova Open-air Market, Bratislava's largest and most frequented, is also located in Ružinov. The Milan Rastislav Štefánik international airport is also located here. The largest shopping center in Slovakia Avion Shopping Park is based in Ružinov, with the Ikea store and surrounded by new office buildings and two hotels (Hotel Gate One Bratislava and Chopin Airport Hotel).

Despite its industrial character, Ružinov is considered to be a relatively green part of Bratislava. In contrast to other city districts, it is rich in streams and lakes (such as Rohlík lake), with a total water area of 616,000 m². At the heart of Ružinov there is the Štrkovec Lake area, a major recreational and sporting centre for Bratislava. Other lakes include Zlaté Piesky, a major summer resort, and Rohlík.

Politics
Ružinov local government was established by the elections in November 1990 and in December 1990, it founded the municipal office of the Ružinov borough. Over time, the number of members of the local parliament was reduced from 60 to 25.

List of Mayors of Ružinov and political parties that nominated them:
 1990 – 1994 – Jozef Olejár (VPN)
 1994 – 1998 – Richard Volek (ĽS-HZDS, SNS, KSÚ)
 1998 – 2002 – Pavol Kubovič (SDK)
 2002 – 2006 – Pavol Kubovič (SDKÚ, KDH, ANO, SMK)
 2006 – 2010 – Slavomír Drozd (Smer-SD, SMK, ĽS-HZDS, SF)
 2010 – 2014 - Dušan Pekár (KDH)
 2014 – 2018 – Dušan Pekár (KDH, OĽaNO, Nova, Zmena zdola, Demokratická únia Slovenska, OKS, SMK-MKP)
 2018 – 2022 – Martin Chren (New Majority (Slovakia), ran as an independent candidate)

Media
 Ružinovské echo - local monthly magazine, established in 1992
 TV Ružinov - local TV station, established in May 1996 as TV RIK
Both media are published and operated by the municipal company TVR a RE, s.r.o.

Religion
Ružinov belongs into three Roman Catholic parishes (Farnosť Bratislava ‐ Prievoz, Farnosť Bratislava ‐ Márie pomocnice kresťanov, Farnosť Bratislava – Trnávka), one Protestant parish (Evanjelický cirkevný zbor AV Bratislava – Prievoz) and one Eastern Orthodox Church parish (Pravoslávna cirkevná obec Bratislava).

The borough features the following churches:
 Orthodox Church of Saint Rastislav (Chrám svätého Rastislava) on Tomášikova Street, consecrated in May 2013.
 Roman Catholic Church of Virgin Mary Help of Christians (Kostol Márie Pomocnice kresťanov a Dom saleziánov dona Bosca) on Miletičova Street No. 7, consecrated in 1990
 Roman Catholic Church of Saint Don Bosco and Salesian Institute at Dornkappl (Kostol sv. D. Bosca a Saleziánsky ústav na Dornkappli), Okružná Street No. 11, consecrated in 1938
 Protestant Lutheran Church in Prievoz (Kostol Evanjelickej cirkvi a. v. Prievoz), Radničné námestie No. 2, consecrated in 1925
 Roman Catholic Church of Saint Vincent de Paul (Kostol sv. Vincenta de Paul) on Tomášikova street, consecrated in 2000

Education
Ružinov is home to several high schools, 9 elementary schools and 11 kindergartens. It also houses the Pan-European University on Tomášikova Street and the Faculty of Social and Economic Studies of the Comenius University on Mlynské luhy Street.

 Elementary schools: ZŠ Borodáčova Street, ZŠ Drieňová Street, ZŠ Kulíškova Street, ZŠ Medzilaborecká Street, ZŠ Mierová Street, ZŠ Nevädzová Street, ZŠ Ostredková Street, ZŠ Ružová dolina Street, ZŠ Vrútocká Street
 There is also the United Church School of Saint Vincent de Paul which combines an elementary school and high school
 Public kindergartens and their allocated classes: MŠ Bancíkovej Street 2, MŠ Exnárova Street 6, MŠ Miletičova Street 37 (including MŠ Gemerská Street 4), MŠ Medzilaborecká Street 4 (including Haburská Street 4), MŠ Piesočná Street 2 (including MŠ Rádiová 52 and MŠ Vietnamská 13), MŠ Západná Street 2), MŠ Prešovská Street 28 (including MŠ Palkovičova Street 11/A), MŠ Pivonková Street 9 (including MŠ Astrová Street 5, MŠ Nevädzová Street 12 and MŠ Šalviová Street 5), MŠ Habarka, Stálicova Street 2 (including MŠ Haburská Street 6), MŠ Šťastná Street 26, MŠ Velehradská Street 24 (including MŠ Budovateľská Street 10 and MŠ Tekovská Street 7, 9)

In the school year 2012/2013, 586 children were accepted into the seven Ružinov kindergartens, 229 children were rejected due to lack of space. In the school year 2016/2017, 658 children were accepted into the eleven Ružinov kindergartens.

Sports
Many sporting clubs are based in Ružinov, including the FK Rapid football club, the Slávia UK volleyball club, the Dunajplavba wrestling club and the street hockey club ŠK H.O.K. Nivy.

Gallery

References

External links
 Official website
 Facts on Bratislava-Ruzinov

Boroughs of Bratislava